The Union of Workers in Food and Allied Industries (GLB) was a trade union representing workers in food production, tobacco manufacture, and related industries, in Austria.

The union was founded by the Austrian Trade Union Federation in 1945.  By 1990, it had 39,517 members.  The following year, it merged with the Union of Agricultural and Forestry Workers, to form the Union of Agriculture, Food and Allied Industries.

Presidents
1945: Karl Mantler

1960: Josef Staribacher
1989: Leopold Simperl

References

Food processing trade unions
Trade unions established in 1945
Trade unions disestablished in 1991
Trade unions in Austria
1945 establishments in Austria
1991 disestablishments in Austria